William Gunning  (21 June 1796 – 11 October 1860) was an English cleric. He was Archdeacon of Bath from his installation on 9 October 1852 until his death on 11 October 1860.

Notes

1860 deaths
Archdeacons of Bath
1796 births